This is a list of holidays in Namibia

References

 
Society of Namibia
Namibian culture
Namibia